Jack Deam (born Ian Deam; 1972) is an English actor. He used his grandfather's name for his stage name. His most notable performances have been as the pyromaniac Marty Fisher, who has Tourette syndrome, in Channel 4's comedy drama series, Shameless, and as Inspector Mallory in Father Brown.

In 1990, Deam appeared in the Granada TV soap opera Families, a show about two families, one from Cheshire, the other in Australia, notably alongside Jude Law.

In 1992, he appeared in a few episodes of Heartbeat as Alan Maskell and returned to the series in 2004 as Jake Clarke. He also appeared in the TV mini series The Life and Times of Henry Pratt. He played the lead role as older Henry Pratt, whilst little Henry Pratt was played by Andrew Nicholson and young Henry Pratt was played by Bryan Dick.

In 1993, he played Vinnie, a young soldier for the King's Fusiliers in the award-winning British drama Soldier Soldier. He later joined the cast of Clocking Off, written by Paul Abbott, playing Kev Leach from series 1-4.

In 1996, he briefly appeared as a policeman in Jimmy McGovern's one-off drama for ITV Hillsborough, based on the 1989 Hillsborough disaster.

In 1999, he appeared in an episode of Queer As Folk, as a Doctor Who-obsessed fan, and had a one-night stand with Vince, one of the protagonists, before taking the role of Toyah Battersby's (Georgia Taylor) rapist Phil Simmonds on the long-running ITV soap opera Coronation Street in 2000.

In 2004, Deam played Detective Sergeant Hanken in "In Pursuit of the Proper Sinner", an episode of The Inspector Lynley Mysteries

In January 2007, he took part in The Afternoon Play, a daytime BBC drama series consisting of short stories.

From 2010 to 2016, he played the part of a detective constable in the DCI Banks series.

He played Walter in the 2011 TV series 32 Brinkburn Street. 2014 saw Deam in a play called Blindsided, by Simon Stephens, at the Royal Exchange, Manchester, alongside ex-Coronation Street Julie Hesmondhalgh (Hayley Cropper).

He appeared in an episode of New Tricks as a suspect in a cold case enquiry.

Starting with its fourth series in 2016, Deam appeared as Inspector Mallory in BBC's Father Brown.

In December 2019, he appeared as Leonard Wooley in Agatha and the Curse of Ishtar, a fictionalized account of how Agatha Christie met Max Mallowan, who later became her second husband.

In September 2021, he appeared as Frank Johnson in Silent Witness on BBC One.

Filmography

External links

1972 births
Living people
Male actors from Oldham
Male actors from Lancashire
English male soap opera actors
20th-century English male actors
21st-century English male actors